Mansur Muhammad Dan Ali  (born 25 August 1959) is a retired Nigerian Army brigadier general and former Minister of Defence of Nigeria appointed by President Muhammadu Buhari in November 2015.

Early life and education
Dan-Ali was born on August 25, 1959 in Zamfara State. He attended Birnin Magaji Town Primary School (1966 -1972) for his elementary education and Government Secondary School, Shinkafi (1972-1977) for his secondary education. He received his Higher National Diploma (HND) in Photogrammetric and Surveying from Kaduna Polytechnic (1977-1982) and possesses a master's degrees in Public Policy and Administration (MPPA) from Bayero University Kano (2004-2005) and a master's degree in Security Studies from the Bangladesh University of Professionals (2009).

Army career
Dan Ali was commissioned as a 2nd Lieutenant in the Nigerian Army in 1984 through the Short Service Commission at the Nigerian Defence Academy. Dan-Ali has served in different command  and staff capacities, some of which include commanding the Nigerian contingent supporting the United Nations Africa Hybrid Mission in Sudan. Dan Ali was on the Directing Staff of the Armed Forces Command and Staff College, Jaji from 2003 -2005 and was Chief Instructor (CI) at the Nigerian Defence Academy in 2010. He was also Acting Director Military Training before getting posted to the Ministry of Defence's Logistics Department as Deputy Director. He retired from the Nigerian Army on August 30, 2013.

Minister of Defence

Dan Ali was confirmed as a Cabinet Minister by the Nigerian Senate in October 2015 and was appointed Minister of Defence by President Muhammadu Buhari in November 2015.

References

1959 births
Living people
Defence ministers of Nigeria
Nigerian generals
Nigerian Army officers
Instructors at the Nigerian Armed Forces Command and Staff College
Nigerian Defence Academy alumni
Nigerian Defence Academy people
Kaduna Polytechnic alumni
Bayero University Kano alumni
Federal ministers of Nigeria
Buhari administration personnel
People from Zamfara State